Kenneth Donovan Clark (June 4, 1927 – June 1, 2009) was an American B movie actor.  He appeared in movies in the United States and Europe, including the Secret Agent 077 trilogy, South Pacific, and a number of Spaghetti Westerns.

Early years
Clark was born in Neffs, Ohio. He enlisted in the Navy when he was 17, and after being honorably discharged, he sought a career as an actor. When that effort was unsuccessful, he found employment as a model and as a construction worker. He also worked as a coal miner in the mid 1950s near Cadiz Ohio.

Acting career

Early career
Clark was originally contracted to 20th Century Fox. While working for that studio, he acquired a reputation as a “beefcake” actor similar to Richard Egan. He appeared in a variety of genres of film, including crime (Six Bridges to Cross), Western (The Last Wagon), and war film (Between Heaven and Hell). Additionally, in one of his final roles for Fox, he appeared in Elvis Presley’s debut motion picture, Love Me Tender. Fox dropped Clark following that picture, and his roles in the following years were often in lower-budget films.

Clark's most prominent role in American film came in 1958, when he was cast as Stewpot in South Pacific, an adaptation of the Broadway musical. His vocals were dubbed by Thurl Ravenscroft. Following the film’s premiere, the New York Times described Clark’s character as a “raffish gob.”

During this period, Clark made many guest star appearances on a variety of American TV shows, including four appearances on Alfred Hitchcock Presents. In 1959, he made an unsold private investigator TV pilot for a William Campbell Gault-inspired mystery series entitled Brock Callahan, directed by Don Siegel and written by Stirling Silliphant. That same year, he made a guest appearance in an episode of Western TV series Colt .45. During this period Clark had the lead in Attack of the Giant Leeches (1959) and 12 to the Moon (1960). The former is regarded by some as Clark’s “most memorable film.”

1960s: Agent 077
During the 1960s and 1970s, like many other American actors Clark went to Italy appearing in several sword and sandal films, Spaghetti Westerns and Eurospy films, including the Hercules film The Son of Hercules in the Land of Darkness, starring fellow American actor Dan Vadis,  in 1963.

In 1965, Clark originated the role of Secret Agent Dick Mallory in the Agent 077 trilogy modeled on James Bond. In one of the pictures from that trilogy, From the East with Fury, Mallory seeks to rescue a kidnapped nuclear scientist.

1970s: Westerns
In 1971, Clark appeared alongside James Garner in Un Uomo Chiamo Slitta (translated as A Man Called Sledge).

Personal life and death 
Clark was married to Bette Blatt, whom he met when they were in high school. They had three children and were divorced in 1980.

According to fellow actor Robert Woods, Clark died of a heart attack in Rome, Italy on June 1, 2009, three days before his 82nd birthday, shortly after a taping for a program on the mid 1960s Eurospy genre on the TV series Starcult.

Partial filmography
Adapted from IMDb and TV Guide.

 1956 On the Threshold of Space Sergeant Ike Forbes
 1956 The Proud Ones as Pike
 1956 The Last Wagon as Sergeant
 1956 Between Heaven and Hell as Morgan
 1956 Love Me Tender as Mr. Kelso
 1957 The True Story of Jesse James as Sergeant (uncredited)
 1958 South Pacific as Stewpot
 1959 The Shaggy Dog as FBI Agent (uncredited)
 1959 Attack of the Giant Leeches as Steve Benton
 1960 Heller in Pink Tights as Soldier Warning the Travelers (uncredited)
 1960 12 to the Moon as Captain John Anderson
 1961 Re Manfredi / King Manfred as Astolfo
 1963 Hercules Against the Mongols as Sayan
 1963 Jacob and Esau as Esau
 1964 None But the Lonely Spy as Robert Liston
 1964 Hercules the Invincible as Kabol
 1964 FX 18 Secret Agent as Francis Coplan
 1964 Hercules Against the Barbarians as Kubilai
 1964 The Road to Fort Alamo as Bud Massidy
 1965 Agent 077: Mission Bloody Mary as Dick Malloy
 1965 Agent 077: From the Orient with Fury as Dick Malloy
 1966  / Savage Gringo / Gunman Called Nebraska as Nebraska
 1966 Special Mission Lady Chaplin as Dick Malloy
 1967 Tiffany Memorandum as Dick Hallam
 1967 Desert Commandos as Captain Fritz Schoeller
 1968 The Fuller Report as Dick Worth
 1969 Tarzana, the Wild Girl as Glen Shipper
 1970 A Man Called Sledge as Floyd
 1981  as Colonnello Stern
 1985 Twice in a Lifetime as Flower Man
 1989 Arena as Marcus Diablo

References

External links
 

Biography and filmography

1927 births
2009 deaths
20th-century American male actors
American male film actors
Male Spaghetti Western actors
Male actors from Ohio
Military personnel from Ohio
People from Belmont County, Ohio